DeMatha Catholic High School is a four-year Catholic high school for boys located in Hyattsville, Maryland, United States. Named after John of Matha, DeMatha is under the Roman Catholic Archdiocese of Washington and is a member of the Washington Catholic Athletic Conference.

Academics
The United States Department of Education recognized DeMatha as a Blue Ribbon School in 1984 and 1991.

Music program
According to the school's website, the music program includes "five concert bands, three choruses, three percussion ensembles, three string orchestras, six levels of music theory, and a History of Rock and Roll class" plus "two jazz ensembles, a pep band for basketball games, a gospel choir, as well as numerous small ensembles."

Athletics

Sports Illustrated recognized DeMatha as the #2 high school athletic program in the United States in 2005, and again in 2007.

Notable alumni

Religious
 Sister Susan Rose Francois (1990), known for tweeting a daily non-violent prayer for President Trump, and for Nuns on the Bus

Arts and entertainment
 Peter Bay (1974), conductor-music director of the Austin Symphony Orchestra
 Bob Bates (1971), designer of games for Infocom, Legend Entertainment, and Zynga
 Daniel DeWeldon (1989), film producer, actor and writer Actors Studio

Television
 James Brown (1969) is a television sportscaster, and currently the host of The NFL Today.
 David Aldridge (1983) is a sports reporter affiliated with television's TNT, and The Philadelphia Inquirer.

Politics
 Justin Fairfax (1996) is a politician, attorney, and the former Lieutenant Governor of Virginia.
Kevin Shea (1972) is the former acting Secretary of Agriculture (2021). Shea has led the USDA agency Animal Plant Health Inspection Services since 2012.
 David J. Schiappa (1980) was the Secretary for the Majority in the United States Senate

Publishing
 Michael Mewshaw (1961) is an author.
 Thomas S. Hibbs (1978) is an American philosopher and author, dean and president of the University of Dallas.
 Jim Nelson (1981) is an editor, formerly Editor-in-Chief of GQ magazine.

Sports

Baseball
 Steve Farr (1974) is a former Major League Baseball relief pitcher (1984–1994).
 Brett Cecil (2004) is a former Major League Baseball pitcher.

Basketball
 Johnny Austin (1962) is a former professional basketball player in the NBA (1966–67) and ABA (1967–68).
 Bernard Williams (1965) is a former professional basketball player in the NBA and ABA.
 Sid Catlett (1967) is a former NBA player (1971–72).
 Adrian Dantley (1973) is a former NBA player (1976–91) and former interim NBA coach.  A member of the 1976 gold medal-winning United States Olympics team, he was inducted into the Naismith Memorial Basketball Hall of Fame in 2008.
 Kenny Carr (1974) is a former NBA player (1977–87), and member of the 1976 gold medal winning United States Olympics team.
 Charles Whitney (1976) is a former professional basketball player, perhaps best remembered for being convicted of kidnapping Hillary Clinton's attorney.
 Mike Brey (1977) is a collegiate basketball coach who is the men's head coach for the University of Notre Dame.
 Dereck Whittenburg (1979) is the former men's head basketball coach at Fordham University.
 Sidney Lowe (1979) is a former NBA player and coach.  He is a former men's head basketball coach at North Carolina State University.
 Ron Everhart (1980) is a college basketball coach, formerly the head coach at Northeastern University and Duquesne University.
 Adrian Branch (1981) is a former NBA player (1986–90).  He is also a television analyst for basketball.
 Danny Ferry (1985) is a former NBA player with the Cleveland Cavaliers who won an NBA championship with the San Antonio Spurs.  Most recently he was general manager of the Atlanta Hawks.
 Steve Hood (1986) is a former professional basketball player who played.
 Jerrod Mustaf (1988) is a former NBA basketball player (1990–94).
 Heath Schroyer (1990) is the former head coach of University of Wyoming.
 Mike Pegues (1996) is a former professional basketball player and current college coach.
 Joseph Forte (1999) is a former professional basketball player, having played in the NBA and last played for Maccabi Tel Aviv of the Israeli Premier League.
 Keith Bogans (1999) is a former NBA player (2003–14).
 Jerai Grant (2007) is a professional basketball player in Europe and Australia and played collegiately at Clemson University.
 Jerian Grant (2010) is a professional basketball player for the Orlando Magic and played collegiately at the University of Notre Dame.
 Victor Oladipo (2010) is a professional basketball player who plays for the Miami Heat and was an All-American at Indiana University.
 Quinn Cook (2010) is a professional basketball player who plays for the Sacramento Kings and played collegiately at Duke University.
 Mikael Hopkins (2011) is a professional basketball player who plays for KK Cedevita Olimpija and played collegiate at Georgetown University.
Kameron Taylor (2011), is a professional basketball player for Maccabi Tel Aviv in the Israeli Basketball Premier League and the EuroLeague
 Jerami Grant (2012) is a professional basketball player who plays for the Portland Trail Blazers and played collegiately at Syracuse University.
Nate Darling (2016) is a professional basketball player who plays for the Charlotte Hornets and played collegiately at the University of Delaware.
Markelle Fultz (2016) is a professional basketball player for the Orlando Magic, who was the first pick of the 2017 NBA Draft.
Josh Carlton (2017) is a NCAA basketball player who plays for the University of Houston
Justin Moore (2019) is an NCAA basketball player who plays at Villanova University.
Jahmir Young (2019) is an NCAA college basketball player who plays for the University of Maryland.
Hunter Dickinson (2020) is an NCAA basketball player who plays for the University of Michigan.
Earl Timberlake (2020) is an NCAA basketball player who plays for the Bryant University.
Jordan Hawkins (2021) is an NCAA basketball player who plays for the University of Connecticut.

Football
 Tom Forrest (1969) is a former offensive guard for the NFL's Chicago Bears (1974).
 Jeff Komlo (1975) is a former quarterback for the Detroit Lions.
 Mike Johnson (1980) is a former All-Pro NFL linebacker (1986-1995).
 Tony Paige (1980) is a former NFL player (1984-1992).
 Steve Smith (1982) is a former NFL running back (1987-1995).
 JB Brown (1985) is a former NFL cornerback (1989–99).
 Bobby Houston (1985) is a former NFL linebacker (1990–98).
 Andrew Bayes (1996) is a former All-American punter at East Carolina University.
 Brian Westbrook (1997) is a former running back for the NFL's Philadelphia Eagles (2002–10).
 John Owens (1998) is a former NFL tight end (2002-2010).
 Cameron Wake (2000) is a former defensive end and two-time CFL Defensive Player of the Year.
 Quinn Ojinnaka (2002) is a former offensive lineman (2006-2012) and now a professional wrestler under the name "Moose" for Impact Wrestling.
 Byron Westbrook (2002) is a former defensive back for the NFL's Washington Redskins (2007-2011).
 Josh Wilson (2003) is a former defensive back for the NFL's Detroit Lions.
 Edwin Williams (2004) is a former offensive lineman for the NFL's Chicago Bears.
 Rodney McLeod (2008) is a safety for the NFL's Philadelphia Eagles.
 Arie Kouandjio (2010) is a former offensive lineman for the NFL's Washington Redskins.
 Cyrus Kouandjio (2011) is a former offensive lineman for the NFL's Denver Broncos.
 Ja'Whaun Bentley (2014), linebacker for the NFL's New England Patriots.
 John Lovett (2014), fullback for the NFL's Miami Dolphins.
 D.J. Turner (2016), wide receiver for the NFL's Las Vegas Raiders 
 Chase Young (2017), 2020 Heisman Trophy finalist, drafted 2nd overall in the 2020 NFL Draft,  defensive end for the Washington Football Team.
 Anthony McFarland Jr. (2017), running back for the NFL's Pittsburgh Steelers
 Nick Cross (2019), Safety for the NFL's Indianapolis Colts

Lacrosse
 Paul Rabil (2004) is a retired professional lacrosse player and co-founder/president of the Premier Lacrosse League.

NASCAR
 Coy Gibbs (1991) is a former NASCAR driver, former assistant coach for the Washington Redskins, and the current owner of Joe Gibbs Racing Motocross.  He is the son of former Redskins head coach Joe Gibbs.

Soccer
 Jordan Graye (2005) is a professional soccer player for the Major League Soccer team Houston Dynamo.
 Drew Yates (2006) is a professional soccer player for the USL Harrisburg City Islanders.
 Bill Hamid (2008) is a professional soccer player for the Major League Soccer team D.C. United.
 Chris Odoi-Atsem (2013) is a professional soccer player for the Major League Soccer team D.C. United.
 Keegan Meyer (2015) is a professional soccer player for USL League One side New England Revolution II.

Track and field
 Derek Mills (1990) is an Olympic gold medalist in track and field at the 1996 Summer Olympics.

Notable staff
 Morgan Wootten is the school's former basketball coach.  He coached the team to five national championships and in 2000 was inducted into the Naismith Memorial Basketball Hall of Fame.
 Eddie Fogler was an assistant basketball coach under Wootten for the 1970-1971 school year.

References

External links
 Official website
 Trinitarian Order official website

Catholic secondary schools in Maryland
Boys' schools in Maryland
Hyattsville, Maryland
Schools in Prince George's County, Maryland
Educational institutions established in 1946
1946 establishments in Maryland
Trinitarian Order